Colin Powell Leadership Academy was a charter school in Dayton, Ohio.  The school met one of the 12 state indicators for the 2005–2006 school year, earning it a rating of "Academic Emergency" by the Ohio Department of Education.

This school is closed.

References

High schools in Dayton, Ohio
Public high schools in Ohio
Public middle schools in Ohio
Public elementary schools in Ohio
Charter schools in Ohio